The 1990 Haringey Council election took place on 3 May 1990 to elect members of Haringey London Borough Council in London, England. The whole council was up for election and the Labour party stayed in overall control of the council.

Background

Election result

|}

Ward results

Alexandra

Neuner was a sitting councillor for Crouch End ward.

Archway

Bowes Park

Bruce Grove

Coleraine

Crouch End

Fortis Green

Green Lanes

Harringay

High Cross

Highgate

Hornsey Central

Hornsey Vale

Muswell Hill

Noel Park

Park

Seven Sisters

South Hornsey

South Tottenham

Willmore was a sitting councillor for the Bruce Grove ward.

Tottenham Central

West Green

Eddie Griffith was a sitting councillor for South Hornsey ward.
Diane Harwood was a sitting councillor for White Hart Lane ward.

White Hart Lane

Woodside

Sharon Lawrence was a sitting councillor for the Harringay ward.

References

1990
1990 London Borough council elections